Campo Baixo is a small settlement located in the southwestern part of the island of Brava, Cape Verde. In English, the name of the village means 'low field'. From Nossa Senhora do Monte, Campo Baixo is accessible by Aluguer buses. 

Near Campo Baixo, there is a small chapel on a hill that is shaped like a ship. The name Santa Maria, referring to Christopher Columbus' ship, is painted on the ship. There are similar monuments and chapels in other places in Cape Verde as well, such as in Nova Sintra.

References 

Villages and settlements in Brava, Cape Verde